Hound TV is an Australian television show about dogs hosted by Steven Pam. The show is currently broadcasting on Australian Community Television Stations.

The show was started by Steven Pam as a video podcast in early 2006. Steven's friend, Matt Tynan later joined in for episode 2 and has stuck around ever since and they produced nearly 30 episodes until they were finally noticed by Melbourne's community TV station, Channel 31.

Hound TV has produced three seasons airing on community TV in Melbourne, Sydney and Adelaide; and is currently on its third season. Most, if not all, of the stories from the TV show will eventually make their way to their official podcast.

DVD release
Season 1 of Hound TV has been released on DVD which contains all eleven episodes of season 1 plus a special behind-the-scenes interview with host, Steven Pam and cameraman, Matt Tynan.

References
Internet Archive: C31 website 18 February 2011

External links
Hound TV Official Website
Miniature & Teacup Puppies

Television shows set in Victoria (Australia)
Australian community access television shows
Special Broadcasting Service original programming
Dog shows and showing
Dogs as pets
Television shows about dogs